Bliss is an unincorporated community in northeast Washington County, in the U.S. state of Missouri. The community is on Mineral Fork adjacent to Missouri Route 47.

History
Bliss was first named "Kingston Furnace", and under the latter name was founded in the 1870s, and named after Wyllys King, proprietor of a local blast furnace. A post office called Bliss was established in 1899, and remained in operation until 1943. The present name is after the local Bliss family.

References

Unincorporated communities in Washington County, Missouri
Unincorporated communities in Missouri